Gabrovo is a very sparsely populated village in Blagoevgrad Municipality, in Blagoevgrad Province, Bulgaria. It is situated on the eastern slope of Vlahina mountain and very close to the border with North Macedonia.

References

Villages in Blagoevgrad Province